|} 

|} 

|} 

|} 

|} 

|} 

|} 

|} 

|} 

|} 

|} 

|} 

|} 

|} 

|} 

|} 

|} 

|} 

|} 

|} 

|} 

|} 

|} 

|} 

|} 

|} 

|} 
|}

Linha do Minho is a railway line which connects the stations of Porto-São Bento and Valença, in Portugal. It was opened on 6 August 1882, when it reached Valença. The section from Valença to Monção was opened on 15 July 1915 and closed on 31 December 1989.
From its Valença terminal, there is a rail connection to Tui just across the Spanish border; RENFE operates through trains between Vigo and Porto-Campanhã.

See also 
 List of railway lines in Portugal
 List of Portuguese locomotives and railcars
 History of rail transport in Portugal

References

Minho
Iberian gauge railways
Railway lines opened in 1882
Railway lines closed in 1989